Sir Thomas Paxton, 1st Baronet (9 May 1860 – 15 March 1930), was a Scottish politician.

Paxton was Lord Provost of Glasgow and Lord-Lieutenant of Glasgow between 1920 and 1923. He was created a baronet, of
Letham in the Parish of Monimail in the County of Fife, in 1923. He declined to contest Glasgow Central in the 1923 general election.

Paxton died in March 1930, aged 69, when the baronetcy became extinct.

References

External links
Portrait of Sir Thomas Paxton, Bt, by William Orpen.

1860 births
1930 deaths
Baronets in the Baronetage of the United Kingdom
Lord Provosts of Glasgow